A Level is a 2017 Sri Lankan Sinhala Teen drama film directed by Rohan Perera and produced by Susara Dinal for Maharaja Entertainments. It stars Jayalath Manoratne, Chandani Seneviratne and Umali Thilakarathne in lead roles along with many new coming teen crew. Music composed by Suresh Maliyadde. The muhurath ceremony was held at the Savoy Theatre, Wallawatte. Despite the film received mixed critical acclaim and film made the record box office during its screening. It is the 1293rd Sri Lankan film in the Sinhala cinema.

Plot
After getting through the O/L Examination with outstanding results, Anuththara with his friends eagerly look forward to experience their final years in school as seniors in the A/L class. They befriend Ahinsa and the other new girls who join their school. Ahinsa draws everyone's attention for her smartness as well as her cheerful yet mysterious behaviour. Her irregular school attendance and the rumours circulating about her, make the others suspect that there's a hidden story behind her cheerfulness.

Cast
 Jayalath Manoratne as Uncle
 Chandani Seneviratne as Lady lawyer
 Umali Thilakarathne as Parami
 Thumindu Dodantenna as Nissanka
 Jayani Senanayake as Sylvia Fernando
 Meena Kumari as Anuththara's mother
 Chamila Peiris as School principal
 Dasun Nishan as Lawyer
 Jayaratne Galagedara as Principal
 Janvi Apsara as Sihini, Parami's daughter
 Sachira Wijesinghe as Anuththara
 Lahiruka Ekanayake as Ahinsa
 Kasun Madhusankha as Yomal
 Chamath Randeni as Ravindu
 Wathsala Shashimal as Ashan
 Niwarthana Dewage as Yahani
 Keshali Rajapakse as Suba
 Viraj Dhanusha as Kalpa

Soundtrack
1st single of the soundtrack; Mathakayan by Nadeemal Perera was released under M Entertainment label on 24 November 2017. 2nd song in the film was released on 14 December 2017.
Lyrics of both tracks were penned by director Rohan Perera with Suresh Maliyadde's music

Accolades

References

External links
 විභාගෙ වගේද චිත්‍රපටය කියලා හිතුණා - Keshali Rajapaksha

2017 films
2010s Sinhala-language films